Sakurano (written: 桜野, meaning "cherry blossom field") is a Japanese surname. Notable people with the surname include:

 (born 1983), Japanese actress
, Japanese manga artist

Fictional characters:
, character in the light novel series Seitokai no Ichizon
, protagonist of the anime series Sky Girls
, protagonist of the light novel series Ginban Kaleidoscope

Japanese-language surnames